Frédéric Clément (born 28 July 1978) is a Martiniquais retired footballer.

Career

At the age of 23, Clément left Martinique for French second division side Stade Lavallois, leaving at the end of 2002/03 due to head coach Victor Zvunka's departure. After that, he played for Wasquehal Football in the French lower leagues as well as  Belgian third division team R.F.C. Tournai, before joining Saint-Denis in Reunion.

In 2007, he signed for Spanish fourth division outfit Torredonjimeno CF. From there, Clément signed for NK Jedinstvo Bihać in the Bosnian second division. Following NK Jedinstvo Bihać, he played returned to Martinique with Aiglon du Lamentin.

References

External links
 

Living people
1978 births
Martiniquais footballers
Association football midfielders
Martinique international footballers
Torredonjimeno CF players
Stade Lavallois players
Wasquehal Football players